Y Cofiadur is published by Cymdeithas Hanes Annibynwyr Cymru, a society founded in 1920 by Undeb yr Annibynwyr Cymraeg. The first issue was published in 1923. It is an annual Welsh-language magazine on the history of religion and contains articles on the history of Welsh Independent churches and the individuals involved, with references. It also includes society notes. The magazine has been digitised by the Welsh Journals Online project at the National Library of Wales.

References

External links
Y Cofiadur at Welsh Journals Online
Union of Welsh Independents

Annual magazines published in the United Kingdom
Religious magazines published in the United Kingdom
Magazines established in 1923
Religion in Wales
Welsh-language magazines